James Hooker Strong (26 April 1814 – 28 November 1882) was a rear admiral of the United States Navy, who served during the American Civil War.

Biography
Strong, born in Canandaigua, New York, was appointed a midshipman in the Navy while he was a student in the Polytechnic College at Chittenango, New York, on 2 February 1829. After various cruises, he commanded the store ship  in 1859.

At the Battle of Mobile Bay, he was the first to ram the Confederate ironclad  and received high commendation for his initiative and valor, and a promotion to captain.

Strong served at the Brooklyn Navy Yard in 1866 and 1867, and later commanded  in the Mediterranean Squadron in 1869 and 1870. He was promoted to rear admiral in 1873 and served as Commander-in-Chief of the South Atlantic Squadron from 1873 to 1875.

Strong retired on 25 April 1876.  He died in Columbia, South Carolina, on 28 November 1882.

Dates of Rank
Midshipman, 2 February 1829. 
Passed Midshipman, 4 June 1836. 
Lieutenant, 8 September 1841. 
Commander, 24 April 1861. 
Captain, 5 August 1865. 
Commodore, 2 March 1870. 
Rear Admiral, 25 September 1873. 
Retired List, 25 April 1876.

Namesakes
Two destroyers have  been named  in his honor.

References

External links

USS Strong (DD-467) site

1814 births
1882 deaths
United States Navy admirals
People from Canandaigua, New York